Larry Dolan (born July 8, 1975) is an American former luger and coach. He competed in the men's singles event at the 1998 Winter Olympics.

References

External links
 

1975 births
Living people
American male lugers
Olympic lugers of the United States
Lugers at the 1998 Winter Olympics
People from Plattsburgh, New York